The Istana Pantai (English: Beach Palace) is one of the temporary official residence of the then Sultan of Brunei, Omar Ali Saifuddien III. The palace is located at Jalan Kuala Tutong, Tutong, Tutong District, Brunei. Moreover, the building has become a tourist attraction and historical site in the present day.

Design and construction
The palace itself is completely built from wood with most of its look preserved. The area around the palace is both facing the Seri Kenangan Beach and South China Sea, and Tutong River.

History
Istana Pantai was built in 1950s and was used by then Sultan Omar Ali Saifuddien III as a seaside retreat.

See also
 Politics of Brunei
 Tutong
 Istana Nurul Iman

References

External links

Government of Brunei

Pantai
Pantai
Official residences in Brunei
Tutong District
Historic sites in Brunei